2009–10 National First Division, was the season from August 2009 until February 2010, of South Africa's second tier of professional football. By the end of the season, the Coastal stream champion Vasco da Gama met to play the overall championship final, against the Inland stream champion Black Leopards. Vasco da Gama won the final, and thereby got promoted to Premier Soccer League. The subsequent playoff stage, was contested by the losing finalist, two second ranked teams of the NFD streams, and the second lowest ranked team of PSL. Winner of the playoff stage, and thereby the second promotion to PSL, was the team Mpumalanga Black Aces.

Season structure
The league is made up of 16 teams, split into 2 streams. Each team plays the other 7 teams in their stream 3 times, for a total of 21 games. Teams receive 3 points for a win, 1 for draw, and 0 for a loss. At the end of the season, the top ranked team from each stream play in a two-legged final, the winner of which is crowned National First Division Champion, and gains automatic promotion to the Premier Soccer League for the next season. The loser of the final, along with the teams which came second in their streams, and the 15th placed PSL team, go into the PSL promotion play-offs. The two teams finishing in last place in their streams are automatically relegated to the Vodacom League. They are replaced by the finalists of the Vodacom League championship game.

Clubs

League standings

Coastal Stream

Inland Stream

Post season

NFD Final
Vasco da Gama and Black Leopards played a two legged tie to determine the 2009–10 NFD champion, and automatic promotion to the PSL. Vasco da Gama won the tie to become NFD champions, and were promoted to the PSL for the 2010–11 season.

Promotion playoffs
Black Leopards (losing finalist), Nathi Lions (2nd in coastal stream), African Warriors (2nd in inland stream), and Mpumalanga Black Aces (15th in PSL), all entered into the promotion playoffs. This playoff competition was played as a cup with two legged matches. The two semifinals were played simultaneously at March 17 and 24, and the two legged final took place at April 3 and 8. The two teams to qualify for the final were Black Leopards and Mpumalanga Black Aces, and after ordinary time of the two matches, the aggregate score ended at 3–3, and thus a penalty shoot out. When the first 5 ordinary shots had been completed, there was a winning score of 5–3 to Mpumalanga Black Aces, who thereby had managed to retain their PSL status.

Semifinals:

Promotion Play Off Final:

References

External links
PSL.co.za

National First Division seasons
South
2009–10 in South African soccer leagues